Kakanj is a town and municipality located in Zenica-Doboj Canton of the Federation of Bosnia and Herzegovina, an entity of Bosnia and Herzegovina. As of 2013, the town has a population of 11,796 inhabitants, with 38,937 inhabitants in the municipality. It is situated in central Bosnia and Herzegovina, north of Visoko and southeast of Zenica. It was built along the slopes of wide hills on either side of the Zgošća river.

History
Neolithic artifacts have been found in Obre, a nearby village. Thus, whole culture that covered central Bosnian river basins was named Kakanj culture. 

Settlements in the region are very ancient. They are claimed to be historical landmarks of the early Bosnian state. Kraljeva Sutjeska, a Franciscan monastery, is of particular historical note. Near the monastery is Bobovac, scene of the last stand of Bosnian Queen Katarina Kosača and medieval residence of Bosnian kings. In Kraljeva Sutjeska is one of the oldest mosques in Bosnia, built by order of Sultan Mehmed II the Victorious during his expedition to Bosnia and conquest of Bobovac.  The Kakanj area enjoyed a renaissance during the rule of the Kotromanić dynasty.

One of the most beautiful tombs ever found in Bosnia, with a carving of a hunting cavalier, was found in Kakanj; it is currently displayed in the botanic garden of The State Museum in Sarajevo.

Kakanj was first mentioned 1468 as settlement with 90 houses. Coal mine Kakanj was founded in 1900 under Austro-Hungarian rule around a developing coal mine, which began production in 1902. In the next hundred years, Kakanj developed organically without any urban planning, initially around the coal mine, and later along the banks of the Zgošća and Bosna rivers.

Bosnian War (1992–95)
The situation in Kakanj at the beginning of the Bosnian War was rather quiet, confronted with the frontlines in the area of Zavidovići. The town was in the middle of the Bosnian government-controlled territory, along the communication path with Zenica. Most of the Serb minority soon left the town, while Bosniak refugees from Serb-controlled towns arrived.

Between March and June 1994, Croats and Bosniaks signed the Washington Agreement, forming the Federation of Bosnia-Herzegovina. The situation in Kakanj improved, but refugees did not came back. Health and sanitation conditions are poor, even though not severe; a hepatitis epidemic is recorded in 1994. Food Security is under control, thanks to humanitarian aid, even though prices remain prohibitive and most of the family survive with company-organized distribution and kitchen gardens.
Almost all productive activities are stopped, and nobody receive any salary, but monthly food packages.

Post-war

On 29 September 1999, the High Representative (OHR) Wolfgang Petrisch removed from office the mayor of Kakanj, Kemal Brodilija, for obstructing the implementation of the Dayton Agreements and pursuing an extra-legal agenda.

Settlements
The municipality consists of following settlements:
Alagići
• Bastašići
• Bašići
• Bičer
• Bijele Vode
• Bijelo Polje
• Bilješevo
• Bistrik-Crkvenjak
• Bištrani
• Bjelavići
• Bosna
• Brežani
• Brnj
• Brnjic
• Bukovlje
• Crnač
• Čatići
• Danci
• Desetnik
• Doboj
• Donja Papratnica
• Donji Banjevac
• Donji Kakanj
• Donji Lučani
• Dračići
• Drijen
• Dubovo Brdo
• Dumanac
• Gora
• Gornja Papratnica
• Gornji Banjevac
• Gornji Lučani
• Govedovići
• Gradac
• Groce
• Halinovići
• Haljinići
• Hausovići
• Hodžići
• Hrasno
• Hrastovac
• Ivnica
• Javor
• Jehovina
• Jerevice
• Jezero
• Kakanj
• Karaula
• Karaulsko Polje
• Klanac
• Kondžilo
• Koprivnica
• Kraljevska Sutjeska
• Krševac
• Kučići
• Kujavče
• Lipnica
• Lučići
• Lukovo Brdo
• Marijina Voda
• Miljačići
• Mioči
• Modrinje
• Mramor
• Nažbilj
• Obre
• Papratno
• Pavlovići
• Pedići
• Podbjelavići
• Podborje
• Poljani
• Poljice
• Pope
• Popržena Gora
• Ratanj
• Ribnica
• Ričica
• Rojin Potok
• Saranovići
• Sebinje
• Semetiš
• Seoce
• Slagoščići
• Slapnica
• Slivanj
• Slivnice
• Sopotnica
• Starposle
• Subotinje
• Termoelektrana
• Teševo
• Tičići
• Tršće
• Turalići
• Turbići
• Varalići
• Veliki Trnovci
• Viduša
• Vrtlište
• Vukanovići
• Zagrađe
• Zgošća
• Zlokuće
• Željeznička Stanica Kakanj
• Živalji.

Demographics

{| border="1" cellpadding="7" cellspacing="0" style="margin: 10px 0 10px 25px; background: #f9f9f9; border: 1px #AAA solid; border-collapse: collapse; font-size: 85%; float: center;"
|- style="background: #E9E9E9"
|colspan ="7" style="background: bgcolor="#F28500" | Population of Kakanj municipality
|-
| style="background: bgcolor="#F5DEB3" | year of census
| style="background: bgcolor="#C2B280" | 2013
| style="background: bgcolor="#C2B280" | 1991. 
| style="background: bgcolor="#C2B280" | 1981.
| style="background: bgcolor="#C2B280" | 1971.

 |-
| style="background: bgcolor="#228B22" | Bosniaks 
|32,341 (86,4%)
|30,528 (54,56%) 
|27,393 (52,55%)
|25,142 (52,84%)
|-
| style="background: bgcolor="#4169E1" | Croats
|2,973 (7,9%)
|16,556 (29,59%)
|16,016 (30,72%)
|15,479 (32,53%)
|-
| style="background: bgcolor="#FF0000" | Serbs 
|281 (0,8%)
|4,929 (8,80%) 
|5,182 (9,94%)
|6,233 (13,10%)
|-
| style="background: bgcolor="#C71585" | Yugoslavs
|
|2,554 (4,56%)
|2,298 (4,40%)
|301 (0,63%)
|-
| style="background: bgcolor="#CC7722" |others and unknown
|1,846 (4,9%)
|1,383 (2,47%)
|1,238 (2,37%)
|425 (0,89%)
|-
|style="background: bgcolor="#F5DEB3" |total|37,441|55,950|52,127|47,580|}

In the census of 1991, the town of Kakanj itself had 12,008 inhabitants.

Ethnic structure by settlements, 1991 censusAbsolute ethnic majority:Relative ethnic majority:'''

Sport
Football club FK Rudar Kakanj
Volleyball club OK Kakanj

Notable people
Amel Tuka, middle-distance runner and World Championships silver medalist
Kornelija Kvesić, basketball player
Mladen Bartulović, footballer
Aida Redžepagić, photographer
Denial Ahmetović, singer
Sasa Palamarevic, water polo player

See also
1934 Kakanj mine disaster
1965 Kakanj mine disaster

References

External links
 kakanj.com.ba 

 
Populated places in Kakanj